Zane Taylor may refer to:

Zane Taylor (footballer) (born 1957), Australian rules footballer for Geelong and Southport
Zane Taylor (American football) (born 1988), American football center
Zane Taylor, a fictional character from the television series "Heroes"